Żerków is a town in Greater Poland Voivodeship (west-central Poland).

Żerków may also refer to:

Żerków, Lower Silesian Voivodeship (south-west Poland)
Żerków, Lesser Poland Voivodeship (south Poland)

See also
Żerkówek